Alex Joseph Dombrandt (born 29 April 1997) is an English professional rugby union player for Harlequins in Premiership Rugby. His primary position is Number 8.

Early years and education
Dombrandt began playing rugby at the age of six for Warlingham R.F.C in Surrey, originally at fly-half before switching into the forwards pack. He attended The John Fisher School as a pupil.

He played no rugby for representative sides or a professional academy before joining Cardiff Metropolitan University in 2015.

He played for Wales under 20s in all five of their games in the 2017 Six Nations Under 20s Championship, qualifying as a resident student at a Welsh university.

Senior playing career
In February 2018 Harlequins announced Dombrandt's signature for the following season.

Dombrandt's form for Harlequins led to calls from Stuart Barnes and others for him to be included in the  international squad. On 2 June 2019 Dombrandt made his England debut, playing in a non-cap match against the Barbarians, in which he scored two tries. In June 2019 he was one of four uncapped players named in England's preliminary World Cup training squad but was not selected for the tournament.

Dombrandt reduced his weight from 130kg (at university) to 120kg by the 2019-2020 season.

He scored a try during Harlequins 43-36 defeat of Bristol Bears in the Premiership semi-final, a game in which Quins recovered from a 28 point deficit to win. He started the following week in the Premiership final against Exeter Chiefs and scored another try as Harlequins won the game 40-38 in the highest scoring Premiership final ever.

On 10 July 2021 Dombrandt made his senior England Test debut in a 70-14 victory against Canada at Twickenham.

International tries

References

External links 
 

1997 births
Living people
English rugby union players
England international rugby union players
Harlequin F.C. players
Rugby union number eights
Alumni of Cardiff Metropolitan University
Rugby union players from Surrey